Centre Calgary was a provincial electoral district in Calgary, Alberta, Canada, mandated to return a single member to the Legislative Assembly of Alberta using the first past the post method of voting from 1913 to 1921.

History
The Centre Calgary electoral district was formed in 1913 from Calgary (provincial electoral district) and abolished in 1921 and once again became part of the Calgary provincial electoral district.

Boundary history

Electoral history
The Centre Calgary provincial electoral district was created in 1913 as part of a contentious re-distribution of boundaries that saw the City of Calgary divided up into three electoral districts. The other two electoral districts were North Calgary and South Calgary.

Conservative candidate Thomas Tweedie won the Centre Calgary's first election held in 1913. He was part of a Conservative sweep of the city that year. The Conservatives had a wave of support due to the unpopularity of the Sifton government in power at the time.

Thomas Tweedie was defeated in a stunning upset by the Calgary Labor temple member Alex Ross. Ross held the electoral district until it was abolished in 1921, as Calgary was reformed into a five-member seat.

Legislature results

1913 general election

1917 general election

See also
List of Alberta provincial electoral districts
Calgary Centre, active federal electoral district
Calgary Centre, provincial electoral district from 1959 to 1970

References

Further reading

External links
Elections Alberta
The Legislative Assembly of Alberta

Politics of Calgary
Former provincial electoral districts of Alberta